Sambour may refer to several places in Cambodia

 Sambour District, a district of Kratie Province, Cambodia
 Sambour Commune, a commune in Batheay District, Kampong Cham Province, Cambodia